is a Japanese film director, screenwriter, and actor.

Life and career
Yūji Tajiri was born in a small town in Hokkaido in 1968. His main interest as a youth was watching movies, and he began writing his own film scripts and making 8mm films while a teenager. At this time he began sneaking into adult theaters, and was impressed by director Kichitaro Negishi's Roman Porno film Crazy Fruit (1981)-- a pink remake of Crazed Fruit (1956).

Tajiri moved to Tokyo and, while attending Teikyo University, continued his movie-going habits. He was impressed with Hisayasu Satō's Lolita: Vibrator Torture (1987), an independent pink film which he saw on a triple-bill with two Nikkatsu films. After he found an advertisement from Shishi studios for assistant director positions, he researched the studio. It had been founded by  pink film veteran Kan Mukai and Satō had made Lolita: Vibrator Torture there. Shishi accepted Tajiri, and he began working at the studio as an assistant director in 1990. Starting as an assistant director, he worked with such directors as Satō and Takahisa Zeze.

Tajiri's directorial debut was with the 1997 film . His second film, was chosen as the Best Film of the year at the Pink Grand Prix, and Tajiri was given the Best Director award. The mainstream "Japanese Film Professional's Award" also awarded the film, choosing it as the seventh best release of the year. Tajiri's 2004 film, Twitch – You Are My Toy about erotic complications in the photography industry, won the bronze prize at the Pink Grand Prix. The film also won awards for Best Actress and Best Cinematography.

Bibliography

English

Japanese

References

 
|-
! colspan="3" style="background: #DAA520;" | Pink Grand Prix
|-

Japanese male film actors
Japanese film directors
Pink film directors
Japanese screenwriters
1968 births
Living people